Urin (Russian: Урин) may refer to 
Urine, a liquid by-product of metabolism in animals
Húrin, a fictional character in the Middle-earth legendarium of J. R. R. Tolkien
Valeri Urin (1934–2023), Soviet football player and coach
Vladimir Urin (born 1947), Russian theatre artist and director